Cherkasy is the name of several rural localities in Russia.

Modern localities
Cherkasy, Chelyabinsk Oblast, a settlement in Polotsky Selsoviet of Kizilsky District in Chelyabinsk Oblast
Cherkasy, Republic of Karelia, a village in Medvezhyegorsky District of the Republic of Karelia

Alternative names
Cherkasy, alternative name of Cherkassy, a selo in Cherkassky Selsoviet of Yeletsky District in Lipetsk Oblast;

See also
Cherkassy, Russia, several rural localities in Russia